This is a list of holders of the title of Sheriff of Meirionnydd between 1400 and 1499.

A sheriff is the legal representative of the monarch, and is appointed annually for each county in Wales and England. Their duty is to keep the peace in the county, and to ensure the country follows the law of the monarch. Originally, the job was a position of status and strength, but today it is principally a ceremonial role.  
 1413-1420: Thomas Strange
 1423-1430: Robert Orell
 1430-1432: Thomas Dankyson 
 1432-1460: Thomas Burneby 
 1434-1435: John Hampton 
 1453-1560: Thomas Parker
 1461-1485: Roger Kenyston
 1485-1509: Peter Stanley

References 

Merionethshire
15th century
Meirionnydd in the 15th century
Welsh history-related lists
Lists of Welsh people by occupation